A pilgrim is one who undertakes a religious journey or pilgrimage.

Pilgrim(s) or The Pilgrim(s) may also refer to:

Arts, entertainment and media

Film, television, radio and the stage
 The Pilgrim (1923 film), a silent film by Charlie Chaplin
 The Pilgrims (film), a 1924 film directed by Edwin L. Hollywood
 The Pilgrim (2014 film), a biographical film about Paulo Coelho
 Pilgrim (film), a 2000 film starring Ray Liotta
 Pilgrim Pictures, two 20th-century film production companies
 Pilgrim Media Group, an American television production company
 Pilgrim Radio, a network of radio stations broadcasting a Christian Radio format, covering parts of the Western United States
 Pilgrims, a fictional ethnic group in the film Wing Commander
 "The Pilgrim" (Law & Order: Criminal Intent), a television episode
 Pilgrim (Arrowverse), a character from the American television series Legends of Tomorrow
 "Pilgrim" (Into the Dark), an episode of the first season of Into the Dark
 The Pilgrim (play), a 1621 play by John Fletcher
 Pilgrim (Baczkiewicz), a series of radio dramas written by Sebastian Baczkiewicz

Music

Performers
 Pilgrims (band), a Spanish funk-rock band
 The Pilgrims (band), an American alternative rock band
 Pilgrim, a jazz combo fronted by saxophonist Christoph Irniger

Albums 
 Pilgrim (Eric Clapton album), 1998
 The Pilgrim (Shaun Davey album), 1983
 The Pilgrim (Marty Stuart album), 1999
 The Pilgrim (Owen Campbell album), 2013
 Pilgrim, by Barry McGuire, 1989
 Pilgrim, by Ruthie Henshall
 The Pilgrim, by Joey Molland, 1992
 The Pilgrim, by Larry Gatlin, 1973

Songs 
 "Pilgrim" (Eric Clapton song), 1998
 "Pilgrim" (MØ song), 2013
 "Pilgrim", by Uriah Heep from Sweet Freedom, 1973
 "Pilgrim", by Scott Walker from Bish Bosch, 2012
 "Pilgrim", by Steve Earle from The Mountain, 1999
 "Pilgrims", by Widespread Panic from Everyday, 1993
 "The Pilgrim", by Iron Maiden from A Matter of Life and Death, 2006
 "The Pilgrim", by Sam Roberts from Love at the End of the World, 2008
 "The Pilgrim", by Wishbone Ash from Pilgrimage, 1971
 "The Pilgrim, Chapter 33", by Kris Kristofferson from The Silver Tongued Devil and I, 1971

In print 
 Pilgrim (Douglass novel) (1998)
 Pilgrim (Findley novel) (1999)
 Pilgrims (short story collection), a short story collection by Elizabeth Gilbert
 The Pilgrim, a periodical begun in 1870 associated with the Old Brethren
 The Pilgrim, a 2010 two-issue comic book limited series published by IDW Publishing
 Billy Pilgrim, a fictional character in Kurt Vonnegut's 1969 novel Slaughterhouse-Five
 Scott Pilgrim, a fictional character in Bryan Lee O'Malley's graphic novel series 
 Pilgrim, a fictional ship in the novel Dick Sand, A Captain at Fifteen

Other uses in arts, entertainment and media
 The Pilgrim (Marini), a 1939 bronze sculpture by Marino Marini
 The Pilgrim, a painting by René Magritte
 Pilgrim (video game), a 1986 text adventure
 Pilgrims (video game), a 2019 point-and-click adventure

Churches 
 Pilgrim Baptist Church, Chicago, Illinois, United States, on the National Register of Historic Places
 Pilgrim Baptist Church (Saint Paul, Minnesota), United States, on the National Register of Historic Places
 Pilgrim Congregational Church (disambiguation)
 Pilgrim Presbyterian Church, Cincinnati, Ohio, United States, on the National Register of Historic Places

Education

United States 
 The Pilgrim Academy, Egg Harbor City, New Jersey
 Pilgrim High School, Warwick, Rhode Island
 Pilgrim Lutheran School, Chicago, Illinois
 Pilgrim Bible College and Central Pilgrim College, now Oklahoma Wesleyan University

Elsewhere 
 Pilgrim Theological College, Australia
 The Pilgrims' School, a boys' preparatory school and cathedral school in Winchester, Hampshire, England Winchester, Hampshire, England

Sports

Football 
 Pilgrims F.C., a London-based side which entered the FA Cup during the 1870s and 1880s
 The Pilgrims F.C., an early 1900s touring side, which twice visited the United States
 Pilgrims F.C., an American side that competed in the 1923–24 National Challenge Cup
 Boston United F.C., an English football club nicknamed "The Pilgrims"
 Plymouth Argyle F.C., an English football club nicknamed "The Pilgrims"

Other sports 
 Pilgrims, an early nickname of the Boston Red Sox baseball team
 Pilgrim Lacrosse League, a former NCAA Division III men's college lacrosse conference in Massachusetts, United States
 Pilgrim Stakes, a Thoroughbred horserace run annually at Belmont Park, Elmont, New York, United States

People 
 Pilgrim (surname)
 Pilgrim (given name)
 Pilgrims (Plymouth Colony), English settlers who came to North America on the Mayflower
 The Pilgrim, a pen name of Australian journalist Theodore Argles (c. 1851–1886)
 List of people known as the Pilgrim

Places in the United States
 Pilgrim, Kentucky, an unincorporated community
 Pilgrim, Michigan, an unincorporated community and census-designated place
 Pilgrim River, Michigan
 Pilgrim Township, Dade County, Missouri
 Pilgrim, Texas, an unincorporated community
 Kruzgamepa River, Alaska, also known as the Pilgrim River

Aircraft 
 Fairchild 100 Pilgrim, a 1930s American monoplane transport
 Pilgrim 100-B N709Y, one of a few surviving aircraft from the early days of aviation in Alaska, built in 1932
 Pilgrim, a Goodyear Blimp from 1925

Ships 
 Pilgrim (brig), an American sailing brig, setting for Richard Henry Dana Jr.'s book Two Years Before the Mast, and a modern replica
 , a canal boat purchased to be sunk as a blockship in 1864
 , in commission from 1870 to 1871
 , a patrol vessel in commission from 1917 to 1919

Other uses 
 Pilgrim (sandwich), an American sandwich
 Rosa 'The Pilgrim', a shrub rose cultivar
 Pilgrim Psychiatric Center, Brentwood, New York, United States, a state-run psychiatric hospital
 Pilgrim Hospital, Lincolnshire, England
 Pilgrim Award, an award presented for Lifetime Achievement in the field of science fiction scholarship
 Pilgrim (automobile), two 1910s American car marques
 Pilgrim Tercentenary half dollar, struck by the United States Mint in 1920 and 1921
 Operation Pilgrim, a British Second World War planned but never implemented operation to seize the Canary Islands
 Pilgrim Nuclear Power Station, Massachusetts, United States
 Pilgrim Pipeline, a planned but never built pipeline from Albany, New York, to Linden, New Jersey, United States

See also 
 , a river patrol boat commissioned in 1942 and stricken in 1947
 General Aviation GA-43, also known as the Pilgrim 150, an American single-engine monoplane airliner first flown in 1932
 Canterbury Pilgrims, English colonists who arrived in Canterbury, New Zealand, on one of the First Four Ships
 Pilgrims Society, a British-American organization
 Pilgrim Trust, a national, charitable, grant-making trust in the United Kingdom
 Château Pèlerin, also known as Pilgrim Castle, a Crusader fortress on the coast of what is now Israel
 Pilgrim Formation, a geologic formation in Montana, United States
 Piligrim (died 991), Bishop of Passau